Transport in Ukraine includes ground transportation (road and rail), water (sea and river), air transportation, and pipelines. The transportation sector accounts for roughly 11% of the country's gross domestic product and 7% of total employment.

Major routes, marked with the letter 'M' for 'International' (Ukrainian: Міжнародний), extend nationwide and connect all major cities of Ukraine, and provide cross-border routes to the country's neighbours.

International maritime travel is mainly provided through the Port of Odesa, from where ferries sail regularly to Istanbul, Varna and Haifa. The largest ferry company presently operating these routes is Ukrferry.

Rail transport in Ukraine connects all major urban areas, port facilities and industrial centres with neighbouring countries. The heaviest concentration of railway track is the Donbas region of Ukraine. Although rail freight transport fell in the 1990s, Ukraine is still one of the world's highest rail users.

The state has a monopoly on the provision of passenger rail transport, and all trains, other than those with cooperation of other foreign companies on international routes, are operated by its company 'Ukrzaliznytsia.

Kyiv Boryspil is Ukraine's largest international airport. It has three main passenger terminals and is the base for the country's flag carrier, Ukraine International Airlines. Other large airports in the country include those in Kharkiv, Lviv and Donetsk (now destroyed). In addition to its flag carrier, Ukraine has a number of airlines including Windrose Airlines, Dniproavia, Azur Air Ukraine, and AtlasGlobal Ukraine. Antonov Airlines, a subsidiary of the Antonov Aerospace Design Bureau, was the only operator of the world's largest fixed wing aircraft, the An-225.

Economy

Transport Infrastructure

Today the transport sector in Ukraine generally meets only the basic needs of the economy and population. The level of safety, quality and efficiency of passenger and freight transport, as well as the infrastructure's amount of energy usage, and the technological burden it places on the environment do not meet modern-day requirements.

Due to the low level of demand, the country's existing transit potential and advantageous geographical position is not fully utilised. There is thus a lag in the development of transport infrastructure, transport and logistics technologies and multimodal transport. All this has made Ukraine uncompetitive as the high costs of transport across the country make the cost of production in the country uncommonly high.

International Transport Corridors
The advantageous geographical position of Ukraine allows for the location of a number of International Transport Corridors on its territory, in particular :
 Pan-European transport corridors № 3, 5, 7, 9;
 Rail Co-Operation Corridors (ORC) № 3, 4, 5, 7, 8, 10 and
 European Transport Corridors – Caucasus – Asia (TRACECA) and Europe – Asia.

Transport Industry 

The share of the transport sector in Ukraine's gross domestic product (according to Goskomstat) as of 2009 was 11.3%. The number of workers employed in the sector is almost 7% of total employment. The transportation infrastructure of Ukraine is adequately developed overall, however it is obsolete and in need of major modernization. A remarkable boost in the recent development of the country's transportation infrastructure was noticed after winning the right to host a major continental sport event the UEFA Euro 2012.

In 2009, Ukrainian infrastructure provided for the transportation of 1.5 billion tons of cargo and 7.3 billion passengers. As the global financial crisis took hold and demand for major export commodities in 2009 fell, the volume of freight traffic decreased by 17.6% when compared with figures from 2008; passenger transport fell by 12.7%.

Rail

The public railways in Ukraine are managed by the state railway company Ukrzaliznytsia

Network length (2010)
The length of the railway network Ukraine ranks third in Europe (21.700 kilometres of track).
  of  standard gauge, electrified

Rail links with adjacent countries
 Belarus
 Russia
 Moldova
 Romania (break-of-gauge:  / )
 Hungary (break-of-gauge:  / )
 Slovakia (break-of-gauge:  / )
 Poland (break-of-gauge:  /  plus a standard gauge cross-border cargo line)

Metro 
In Ukraine, there are 4 metro systems: the Kyiv Metro, the Kharkiv Metro, the Dnipro Metro and the Kryvyi Rih Metro.

Roads and Auto

The development of public roads in Ukraine is currently lagging behind the pace of motorisation in the country. During 1990-2010 the length of the highways network hardly increased at all. The density of highways in Ukraine is 6.6 times lower than in France (respectively 0.28 and 1.84 kilometres of roads per square kilometre area of the country). The length of express roads in Ukraine is 0.28 thousand km (in Germany – 12.5 thousand kilometres in France – 7.1 thousand kilometres), and the level of funding for each kilometre of road in Ukraine is around 5.5 – 6 times less than in those locations.

This is due to a number of objective reasons, including that the burden of maintaining the transport network per capita is significantly higher than in  European countries because of Ukraine's relatively low population density (76 people per square kilometre), low purchasing power of citizens (1/5 of the Eurozone's purchasing capacity), relatively low car ownership and the nation's large territory.

The operational condition of roads is very poor; around 51.1% of roads do not meet minimum standards, and 39.2% require major rebuilds. The average speed on roads in Ukraine 2–3 times lower than in Western countries.
As of 2016, many of Ukraine's major provincial highways are in very poor condition, with an Ukravtodor official stating that 97% of roads are in need of repair.  The road repair budget was set at about ₴20 billion, but corruption causes the budget to be poorly spent and overweight trucks are common place rapidly causing more road damage.

Total: 169,477 km
Paved:  (including  of expressways); note – these roads, classified as "hard-surfaced", include both hard-paved highways and some all-weather gravel-surfaced roads.
Unpaved:  (2004)

Principal roads
 Motorways in Ukraine,  (2010):

Kyiv – Boryspil | Kharkiv – Dnipro

 State Highways,  (2009):
M01 | M02 | M03 | M04 |
M05 | M06 | M07 | M08 | M09 | M10 | M11 | M12 | M13 | M14 | M15 | M16 | M17 | M18 | M19 | M20 | M21 | M22 | M23

Note: State highways are important national routes and are not necessarily high-speed roads

Aviation

Outlook

The aviation section in Ukraine is developing very quickly, having recently established a visa-free program for EU nationals and citizens of a number of other 'Western' nations, the nation's aviation sector is handling a significantly increased number of travellers. Additionally, the granting of the Euro 2012 football tournament to Poland and Ukraine as joint hosts has prompted the government to invest huge amounts of money into transport infrastructure, and in particular airports.

Currently there are three major new airport terminals under construction in Donetsk, Lviv and Kyiv, a new terminal has already opened in Kharkiv and Kyiv's Boryspil International Airport has recently begun operations at Terminal F, the first of its two new international terminals. Ukraine has a number of airlines, the largest of which is the nation's flag carrier, UIA. Antonov Airlines, a subsidiary of the Antonov Aerospace Design Bureau is the only operator of the world's largest fixed wing aircraft, the An-225.

Donetsk Airport destroyed due to War in Donbass.

New terminal at Odesa International Airport has been opened for arrival flights on April 14, 2017.

Airports

Total: 412 (2012)

Airports with paved runways
Total: 179
Over 3,047 m: 13
2,438 to 3,047 m: 49
1,524 to 2,437 m: 22
914 to 1,523 m: 6
Under 914 m: 89 (2012)

Major airports are: Kyiv Boryspil Airport, Dnipro International Airport, Kharkiv Airport, Lviv Airport, Donetsk Airport, Odesa Airport, and Simferopol Airport.

Airports with unpaved runways 
Total: 233
2,438 to 3,047 m: 2
1,524 to 2,437 m: 6
914 to 1,523 m: 9
Under 914 m: 216 (2012)

Heliports
Total: 7 (2012)

Water transport

River transport
 navigable waterways on 7 rivers, most of them are on Danube, Dnieper and Pripyat rivers. All Ukraine's rivers freeze over in winter (usually December through March), limiting navigation. However, river icebreakers are available on the Dnieper, at least in vicinity of Kyiv.

Danube
The most important waterway of Ukraine.
 Izmail
 Reni Commercial Seaport
 Ust-Danube Commercial Seaport

Dnipro
Dnipro within Ukraine is a regulated system of reservoirs separated by dams with shiplocks. The river is navigable through all its Ukrainian length.
 Cherkasy
 Dnipro
 Kakhovka
 Kremenchuk
 Kyiv River Terminal
 Nikopol
 Zaporizhzhia

Pripyat
Notable riverport Chernobyl is now abandoned due to the Chernobyl disaster, but the waterway retains its importance as part of the Dnieper–Baltic Sea route.

Southern Bug
Plans are announced to revitalize commercial freight navigation on the Southern Bug as part of the increasing grain export from Ukraine.

Sea transport

Merchant marine
Total: 134 ships ( or over) totaling /
Ships by type: bulk carrier 3, cargo ship 98, chemical tanker 1, passenger ship 6, passenger/cargo ship 5, petroleum tanker 8, refrigerated cargo ship 11, specialized tanker 2 (2010)

Sea ports and harbours

As of July 2013, Ukraine had 18 "marine trade ports" available for foreign ships' entry. Some of these "marine trade ports" are actually port conglomerates comprising several non-adjacent ports and tenant private terminals. Major river ports are also considered "marine" international ports.
 
 Berdyansk (Sea of Azov)
 Agro-CLASS (oil terminal)
 Bilhorod-Dnistrovsky Seaport (Black Sea)
 Port Buhaz (auxiliary)
 Theodosia (Black Sea)
 Chornomorsk (Black Sea)  (Ukrferry: Odesa — Istanbul / Derince / Haifa / Varna)
 Aldi (specialized complex)
 Chornomorsk Fuel Terminal
 Chem-Oil-Transit-Ukraine
 Trans Bulk Terminal (grain complex)
 Ship Maintenance Factory
 Fishing port
 Izmail (Danube river / Black Sea)
 Triton Services Agency Ukraine (oil pier)
 Portoflot (specialized terminal)
 Kerch (Black Sea)
 Zaliv Shipbuilding yard
 Port Krym  (ferry: Kerch — Port Kavkaz (Russia))
 Fishing port
 Oil terminal of fishing port
 TES-Terminal
 Port Kamysh-Burun (Azov Sea)
 Kherson (Dnipro river / Black Sea)
 Kherson Shipyard
 All-Ukrainian Industrial Union
 Palada
 Mariupol (Sea of Azov)
 Metallurgy Complex Azovstal
 Ship Maintenance Factory
 Freight terminal of ship maintenance factory
 Mykolayiv (Southern Bug river / Black Sea)
 Freight terminal of Nika-Terra
 Freight terminal of Okean
 Freight terminal of Black Sea Shipyard
 Freight terminal of Mykolaiv Alumina Factory
 Freight terminal of Nibulon
 Freight terminal of Greentour-ex
 Port of Mykolaiv Grain Elevator (grain terminal)
 Port Ochakiv 
 Dnipro-Buh Sea Terminal
 Olvia (in Mykolayiv, Southern Bug river / Black Sea), a "specialized" weapons-transiting port
 Port of Odesa (Black Sea)
 Reni (Danube river / Black Sea)
 Port of Sevastopol (Black Sea)
 Port Balaklava (auxiliary)
 Skadovsk (Black Sea) 
 Port Khorly (auxiliary)
 Port Henichesk (auxiliary)
 Ust-Dunaisk (Vylkove) (Danube river / Black Sea)
Port of Kiliya
 Yalta (Black Sea)
 Yuzhny (Black Sea)
 Trans invest service
 Trans invest service (containers)
 Sea Side (Ukraine)
 UkrTransNafta (oil terminal)
 Borivage (grain terminal)
 Transbunker-Yuzhny 
 Yevpatoria (Black Sea)

Other notable seaports
 Donuzlav (Black Sea)
 Chornomorske (Black Sea) – Ukraine's offshore drilling base port

Important supporting agencies
 Delta Lotsman, the maritime pilot company serving the territorial waters of Ukraine
 "Derzhhidrohrafiya" (State Hydro Geography), a scientific-production complex of hydro-geographical state companies and science-research center "Ukrmorkartohrafiya" (all lighthouses located in Ukraine belong to the institution) The Black Sea Fleet of the Russian Federation refuses to surrender former Soviet navigational facilities since 1997
 Maritime Security Agency in correspondence of the SOLAS International Convention (including its amendment the ISPS Code)
 Shipping registry of Ukraine
 Port registry of Ukraine

Shipping companies
 UkrFerry
 Ukrrichflot
 Ukrainian Danube Shipping, freight and passenger transportation company (primarily Danube river delta)
 Black Sea Shipping Company, freight and passenger transportation company

Ship building and maintenance companies
 Ship building and maintenance companies of Ukraine

Pipelines

 natural gas  (2010)
 crude oil  (2010)
 petroleum products  (2010)
 ammonia

The natural gas transport-system can take in a maximum of 288 billion cubic meters of natural gas per year. Its annual output capacity is 178.5 billion cubic meters, including 142.2 billion to be forwarded to European countries.

See also
 List of the busiest airports in Ukraine
 Transport in Kyiv

References

External links

Unofficial databases
 Shipowners database, arranged by country
 All lighthouses of Ukraine
 Informational-reference website "Ukraine"